Yasaman Farzan ( was born 1977 in Tabriz) is an Iranian researcher. She is a faculty member of Institute for Research in Fundamental Sciences.

Awards 
 The Kharazmi young scientist Award in 2006
 Young Scientist Prize of the International Union of Pure and Applied Physics (IUPAP) in 2008
 International Centre for Theoretical Physics Prize in 2013

References

External links 

LIST OF WINNERS IN 1ST – 41ST INTERNATIONAL PHYSICS OLYMPIADS

People from Tabriz
1977 births
Living people
Iranian physicists
Sharif University of Technology alumni